Abbasabad (also Romanized as ‘Abbāsābād) is a village in Soltaniyeh Rural District, Soltaniyeh District, Abhar County, Zanjan Province, Iran. At the 2006 census, its population was 26, in 5 families.

References 

Populated places in Abhar County